The 2019 Holiday Bowl was a college football bowl game played on December 27, 2019. Kickoff was at 8:07 p.m. EST (5:07 p.m. local PST). The game was aired on FS1. It was the 42nd edition of the Holiday Bowl, and was one of the 2019–20 bowl games concluding the 2019 FBS football season. This was the third season in which the Holiday Bowl was held at the SDCCU Stadium. The game was sponsored by San Diego County Credit Union and officially known as the San Diego County Credit Union Holiday Bowl.

This game also marked the last Holiday Bowl with a conference tie-in with the Big Ten, as starting in 2020, the bowl will have a conference tie-in with the ACC. This is also the last game played at SDCCU Stadium as the 2020 edition was cancelled due to the COVID-19 pandemic and due to the site being demolished to make way for a new stadium.

Teams
The game featured the USC Trojans of the Pac-12 Conference and Iowa Hawkeyes of the Big Ten Conference. This was the 10th meeting between the two programs, with USC holding a 7–2 edge in previous meetings. This was Iowa's fourth Holiday Bowl, going 2–0–1 in previous appearances in 1986 (won against SDSU Aztecs 39–38), 1987 (won against Wyoming Cowboys 20–19) and 1991 (tied against BYU Cougars 13–13 – this was the last time a postseason game was tied in the NCAA). This was USC's third Holiday Bowl, going 1–1 in previous appearances in 2014 (won against Nebraska Cornhuskers 45–42) and 2015 (lost against Wisconsin Badgers 21–23). The teams had previously met in the 2003 Orange Bowl, where USC won by a score of 38–17.

USC Trojans

The Trojans entered the game with an 8–4 record (7–2 in conference) and ranked 22nd in the AP Poll. The Trojans finished in second place in the Pac-12's South Division. USC was 2–3 against ranked teams.

Iowa Hawkeyes

The Hawkeyes entered the game ranked 19th in the AP Poll (16th in the CFP poll), with a 9–3 record (6–3 in conference). The Hawkeyes finished in third place in the Big Ten's West Division. Iowa was 1–3 against ranked teams.

Game summary

Statistics

References

External links

Media guide
Game statistics at statbroadcast.com

Holiday Bowl
Holiday Bowl
USC Trojans football bowl games
Iowa Hawkeyes football bowl games
Holiday Bowl
Holiday Bowl